SPB may refer to:

Places
 Saint Petersburg, Russia

Science and technology
 Shortest Path Bridging in the IEEE 802.1aq standard
 Slowly pulsating B star, a type of variable star
 Spindle pole body, the functional equivalent of the mammalian centriole in yeast
 Superpressure balloon

Transportation
 Scappoose Industrial Airpark, Oregon, USA, FAA LID
 Schynige Platte Bahn, a mountain railway in Switzerland
 Charlotte Amalie Harbor Seaplane Base, U.S. Virgin Islands, IATA airport code SPB
 Shepherd's Bush railway station, London, National Rail station code SPB

Other uses
 Society of the Precious Blood, Anglican religious order
 S. P. Balasubrahmanyam (1946–2020), Indian playback singer, actor, music director, voice actor and film producer
 SPB Software, mobile software developer
 Belarus Free Trade Union, a trade union in Belarus
State Procurement Board in South Australia
 Sparisjóðabanki, also known as SPB hf., a defunct bank in Iceland